Ko Pin-yi (born 31 May 1989) is a Taiwanese professional pool player. He became multiple World Champion in the disciplines of 9-ball and 10-ball in 2015.

Career
Ko defeated Carlo Biado in the final of the 2015 WPA World Ten-ball Championship. 

He then defeated Shane Van Boening in the final of the 2015 WPA World Nine-ball Championship. 

At the junior level, Ko twice won the World Nine-ball Junior Championship in 2007 and 2008.

Personal
Ko is the oldest of three brothers. His younger brothers, Ko Ping-chung and Ko Ping Han, are also professional pool players.

Career titles and achievements
 2022 APF Asian 9-Ball Open 
 2022 Predator Bucharest Open 
 2018 China Open 9-Ball Championship 
 2017 CBSA Pengzhou 9-Ball Open 
 2016 All Japan Championship 10-Ball
 2015 Billiards Digest Player of the Year
 2015 WPA World Ten-ball Championship
 2015 World Cup of Pool - with (Chang Yu-lung)
 2015 WPA World Nine-ball Championship
 2014 CSI U.S. Open Ten-ball Championship
 2013 Asian Indoor and Martial Arts Games 9-ball Singles
 2013 All Japan Championship 10-Ball
 2012 Golden Break 9-ball Open
 2012 World Team Championship 
 2011 All Japan Championship 10-Ball
 2011 Guinness Series of Pool 10-Ball
 2010 Asia vs Europe Challenge Match
 2009 Hokuriku 9-Ball Open 
 2008 Hokuriku 9-Ball Open
 2008 Bangkok Brunswick Open
 2008 WPA World Nine-ball Junior championship 
 2007 WPA World Nine-ball Junior championship

References

External links

WPA World Ten-ball Champions
WPA World Nine-ball Champions
Taiwanese pool players
1989 births
Living people
Asian Games medalists in cue sports
Asian Games bronze medalists for Chinese Taipei
Medalists at the 2010 Asian Games
Cue sports players at the 2010 Asian Games
Medalists at the 2017 Summer Universiade